The Republican People's Party (acronymized as CHP ) is a Kemalist and social democratic political party in Turkey which is currently the main opposition party. It is also the oldest political party in Turkey, founded by Mustafa Kemal Atatürk, the first president and founder of the modern Turkish Republic. The party is also cited as the founding party of modern Turkey. Its logo consists of the Six Arrows, which represent the foundational principles of Kemalism: republicanism, reformism, laicism (Laïcité/Secularism), populism, nationalism, and statism. It is currently the second largest party in Grand National Assembly with 135 MPs, behind the ruling conservative Justice and Development Party (AKP).

The political party has its origins in the various resistance groups founded during the Turkish War of Independence. Under the leadership of Mustafa Kemal Atatürk they united in the 1919 Sivas Congress. In 1923, the "People's Party" declared itself to be a political organisation and announced the establishment of the Turkish Republic, with Atatürk as its first president. In 1924, the People's Party renamed itself the "Republican People's Party". As Turkey moved into its one-party period, the CHP was the apparatus of implementing far reaching political, cultural, social, and economic reforms in the country.

After World War II, Atatürk's successor, İsmet İnönü, allowed for multi-party elections, and the party initiated a peaceful transition of power after losing the 1950 election, ending the one-party period and starting Turkey's multi-party period. The years following the 1960 military coup saw the party gradually trend towards the center-left, which was cemented once Bülent Ecevit became chairman in 1972. The CHP, along with all other political parties of the time, was banned by the military junta of 1980. The CHP was re-established with its original name by Deniz Baykal on 9 September 1992, with the participation of a majority of its members from the pre-1980 period. Since 2011 Kemal Kılıçdaroğlu has been chairman of the CHP.

It is a founding party of the Nation Alliance, a coalition consisting of opposition parties like the Good Party, Felicity Party, and Democrat Party against the AKP and their People's Alliance. In addition, CHP is an associate member of the Party of European Socialists (PES), a member of the Socialist International, and the Progressive Alliance. Many politicians of CHP have declared their support for LGBT rights and the feminist movement in Turkey. The party is pro-European and supports Turkish membership to NATO.

The party's base includes the middle and upper-middle classes such as white-collar workers, retired generals, government bureaucrats, academics, college students, left-leaning intellectuals, labour unions such as DİSK, and Alevis. The party's strongholds include the Western Aegean region (İzmir, Aydın, Muğla), Thrace, the east of the Black Sea Region (Ardahan and Artvin), and the Anatolian college town of Eskişehir.

History

Establishment
The Republican People's Party has its origins in the resistance organizations, known as Defence of Rights Associations, created in the immediate aftermath of World War I in the Turkish War of Independence. In the Sivas Congress, Mustafa Kemal Pasha (Atatürk) and his colleagues united the Defence of Rights Associations into the Association for the Defence of National Rights of Anatolia and Rumelia (Anadolu ve Rumeli Müdâfaa-i Hukuk Cemiyeti) (ADNRAR), and called for elections in the Ottoman Empire to elect representatives associated with the organization. ADNRAR members proclaimed the Grand National Assembly as a counter government from the Ottoman government in Istanbul. Grand National Assembly forces militarily defeated Greece, France, and Armenia, overthrew the Ottoman government, and abolished the monarchy. After the 1923 election, ADNRAR was transformed into a political party called the People's Party (Halk Fırkası). Because of the unanimity of the new parliament, the republic was proclaimed, the Treaty of Lausanne was ratified, and the Caliphate was abolished the next year.

One-party period: 1923–1950

In 1924, opposition to Mustafa Kemal Atatürk resulted in the foundation of the Progressive Republican Party (TCF). Reacting to the foundation of the TCF, his People's Party changed its name to the Republican People's Party (Cumhuriyet Halk Fırkası, soon Cumhuriyet Halk Partisi) (CHP). The life of the TCF was short. The TCF faced allegations of involvement in the Sheikh Said rebellion and for conspiring with members of the Committee of Union and Progress to assassinate Atatürk in the İzmir Affair. Because of this, it was banned by the government, and its members were tried. From 1925 until 1946, Turkey was under one-party rule, with one interruption; another brief experiment of opposition politics through the formation of the Liberal Republican Party.

In the period of 1924–1946, the CHP introduced sweeping social, cultural, educational, economic, and legal reforms that transformed Turkey into a Western modeled state. Such reforms included strict secularism (laïcité) and Turkish nationalism, women's suffrage, converting written Turkish from Arabic script into Latin script, adoption of Swiss and Italian legal and penal codes, and the acceleration of industrialization, to name a few. In the period of 1930–1939, Atatürk's CHP clarified its ideology by adopting the 'Six Arrows', as well as borrowing tenets from Communism and Fascism. It was during the one-party period that Inspectorates-General, Independence Tribunals, and military force were employed by Atatürk to suppress opposition to his reforms, at the expense of religious conservatives and Kurds. In the parties third convention, the party clarified their approach towards the religious minorities of the Christians and the Jews, accepting them as real Turks as long as they adhere to the national ideal and use the Turkish language.

On 12 November 1938, the day after Atatürk's death, his ally İsmet İnönü was elected the second president and assumed leadership of the Republican People's Party. İnönü's presidency saw the annexation of the Hatay State and the establishment of Village Institutes. İnönü adopted a policy of neutrality despite attempts by the Allies and Axis powers to bring Turkey into World War II. The party was associated with anti-communism. In the aftermath of World War II, İnönü called for a multi-party general election in 1946 – the first multi-party election in the country's history. The Motion with Four Signatures resulted in the resignation of some CHP members who then founded the Democrat Party (DP), which challenged the party in the election. The result was a victory for the CHP, which won 395 of the 465 seats, amid criticism that the election did not live up to democratic standards. However, four years later, a more free and fair general election was held in 1950 that led to the CHP losing power to the DP. İnönü presided over a peaceful transition of power. The 1950 election marked the end of the CHP's last majority government. The party has not been able to regain a parliamentary majority in any subsequent election since.

1950–1980 
Due to the winner-take-all system in place during the 1950s, the DP achieved landslide victories in elections that were reasonably close, meaning the CHP was in opposition for 10 years. In the mean time, the party began a long transformation into a social democratic force. In its ninth congress in 1951, the youth branch and the women's branch were founded. In 1953, the establishment of trade unions and vocational chambers was proposed, and the right to strike for workers was added to the party program. The Democrat Party was abolished after the 1960 military coup, and Prime Minister Adnan Menderes, Foreign Minister Fatin Rüştü Zorlu, and Finance Minister Hasan Polatkan were hanged in the İmralı island prison. Right-wing parties which trace their roots to the DP have since continuously attacked the CHP for their perceived involvement in the hanging of Adnan Menderes.

With electoral law reform implementing proportional representation, the CHP emerged as the first-placed party at the general election of 1961, and formed a grand coalition with the Justice Party, a successor-party to the Democrat Party. This was the first coalition government in Turkey, which endured for seven-months. İnönü was able to form two more governments with other parties until the 1965 election. His labor minister Bülent Ecevit was instrumental in giving Turkish workers the right to strike and collective bargaining. As leader of the Democratic Left movement in the CHP, Ecevit contributed to the party adopting the Left of Centre (Ortanın solu) programme for that election, which they lost. İnönü remained as opposition leader and the leader of the CHP until 8 May 1972, when he was overthrown as party leader by Ecevit in a party congress, due to his endorsement of the military intervention of 1971. 

Ecevit adopted a distinct left wing role in politics and, although remaining staunchly nationalist, attempted to implement democratic socialism into the ideology of CHP. Support for the party increased when he became prime minister in 1974 and invaded Cyprus. The CHP achieved its best ever result in a free and fair multi-party election under Ecevit, when in 1977, the party received 41% of the vote. The 1970s featured constant changes in government between the CHP and the Justice Party, as well as intense political violence. This ended in a military coup in 1980, resulting in the banning of every political party and major politicians being jailed and banned from politics.

1980–present
Both the party name "Republican People's Party" and the abbreviation "CHP" were banned until 1987. Until 1999, Turkey was ruled by the centre-right Motherland Party (ANAP) and the True Path Party (DYP), unofficial successors of the Democrat Party and the Justice Party, as well as, briefly, by the Islamist Welfare Party. CHP supporters also established successor parties. By 1985, Erdal İnönü, İsmet İnönü's son, consolidated two successor parties to form the Social Democratic Populist Party (SHP), while the Democratic Left Party (DSP) was formed by Rahşan Ecevit, Bülent Ecevit's wife (Bülent Ecevit took over the DSP in 1987). After the ban on pre-1980 politicians was lifted in 1987, Deniz Baykal refounded the CHP in 1992, and the SHP merged with the party in 1995. However, Ecevit's DSP remained separate, and to this day has not merged with the CHP. Observers noted that the two parties held similar ideologies and split the Kemalist vote in the nineties. From 1991 to 1996, the SHP and then the CHP were in coalition governments with the DYP. Baykal supported Mesut Yılmaz's coalition government after the collapse of the Welfare-DYP coalition following the 28 February "post-modern coup." However, due to the Türkbank scandal, the CHP withdrew its support and helped depose the government with a no confidence vote. Ecevit's DSP formed an interim-government, during which the PKK leader Abdullah Öcalan was captured in Kenya. As such, in the election of 1999, the DSP benefited massively in the polls at the expense of CHP, and the party failed to exceed the 10% threshold (8.7% vote), not winning any seats.

In the 2002 general election, the CHP came back with 20% of the vote but 32% of the seats in parliament, as only it and the new AKP (Justice and Development Party) received above the 10% threshold to enter parliament. With DSP's collapse, CHP became Turkey's main Kemalist and center-left party. It also became the second largest party and the main opposition party, a position it has retained since. Since the dramatic 2002 election, the CHP has been racked by internal power struggles, and has been outclassed by the AKP governments of Recep Tayyip Erdoğan. Many on the left were critical of the leadership of CHP, especially Baykal, who they complained was stifling the party of young blood by turning away the young who turn either to apathy or even vote for the AKP. This perception wasn't helped by Baykal's endorsement of undemocratic attempts by the army and judiciary to shut down the AKP. Between 2002 and 2010, Turkey held three general elections and two local elections, all of which the CHP received between 18-23% of the vote. On 10 May 2010, Deniz Baykal announced his resignation as leader of the Republican People's Party after a clandestinely made video tape of him sitting on a bed with a woman was leaked to the media. Kemal Kılıçdaroğlu was elected to be the new party leader, however even with Kılıçdaroğlu at the helm, after four general elections the CHP has still not won an election, receiving between only 22 and 26% of the vote in parliamentary elections. CHP and MHP's joint candidate for the 2014 presidential election Ekmeleddin İhsanoğlu lost to Erdoğan with only 38% of the vote.  

In the 2018 general election the CHP, Good Party, Felicity, and Democrat Party established the Nation Alliance to challenge the AKP and MHP's People's Alliance. Though CHP's vote was reduced to 22%, strategic voting for the other parties yielded the alliance 33% of the vote. Their candidate for president: Muharrem İnce, received only 30% of the vote. The Nation Alliance was re-established for the 2019 local elections, which saw great gains for the CHP, capturing nearly 30% of the electorate and the municipal mayoralties of İstanbul and Ankara. Some consider their new respective mayors Ekrem İmamoğlu and Mansur Yavaş possible candidates for the upcoming 2023 presidential election. Kılıçdaroğlu and his counterpart in the Good Party Meral Akşener continue a close cooperation as leaders of opposition parties, and the two parties are gaining in the polls, especially amongst the youth, due to the ongoing economic crisis and government mismanagement of the COVID-19 pandemic.

Ideology and political positions 
The Republican People's Party is a centre-left political party that espouses social democracy and Kemalism. The CHP describes itself as a ''modern social-democratic party, which is faithful to the founding principles and values of the Republic of Turkey". 

The party holds a significant position in the Socialist International, Progressive Alliance and is an associate member of the Party of European Socialists. In 2014 the CHP urged the Socialist International to accept the Republican Turkish Party of Northern Cyprus as a full member.

The distance between the party administration and many leftist grassroots, especially left-oriented Kurdish voters, contributed to the party's shift away from the political left. Leftists criticize the party's continuous opposition to the removal of Article 301 of the Turkish penal code, which caused people to be prosecuted for "insulting Turkishness" including Elif Şafak and Nobel Prize winner author Orhan Pamuk, its conviction of Turkish-Armenian journalist Hrant Dink, its attitude towards minorities in Turkey, as well as its Cyprus policy.

Numerous politicians from the party have espoused support for LGBT rights, and the feminist movement in Turkey

The party is pro-European and supports Turkish membership to the European Union.

Electorate 

The CHP draws its support from professional middle-class secular and liberally religious voters. It has traditional ties to the middle and upper-middle classes such as white-collar workers, retired generals, and government bureaucrats as well as academics, college students, left-leaning intellectuals and labour unions such as DİSK. The party also appeals to minority groups such as Alevis. According to The Economist, "to the dismay of its own leadership the CHP's core constituency, as well as most of its MPs, are Alevis." The party's leader, Kemal Kılıçdaroğlu, is also an Alevi himself.

The CHP also draws much of their support from voters of big cities and coastal regions. The party's strongholds are the west of the Aegean Region (İzmir, Aydın, Muğla), the northwest of the Marmara Region (Turkish Thrace; Edirne, Kırklareli, Tekirdağ, Çanakkale), the east of the Black Sea Region (Ardahan and Artvin), and the Anatolian college town of Eskişehir.

Internal caucuses 

CHP has several internal caucuses.
Kılıçdaroğlu group (Kılıçdaroğlu grubu), a caucus that is in favor of Nation Alliance and leadership of Kemal Kılıçdaroğlu.
10 December Movement (10 Aralık Hareketi), a caucus founded by former DİSK secretary Süleyman Çelebi to create an alternative "new party". It defends social democracy and federalism, while opposing Kemalism and unitarism within the party. They have included ÖDP, SHP, DSP and independent left candidates in their tickets.
İnce group (İnce grubu), a caucus that endorsed Muharrem İnce's presidential candidacy and opposition within the party. It includes Kemalist and Ulusalcı circles. In 2021 Muharrem İnce broke away from the CHP, and founded the Homeland Party.
Baykal group (Baykal grubu), a caucus that is founded by names loyal to Deniz Baykal. It lost its significance due to Baykal's stagnating health.
Left Wing for the Future (Gelecek İçin Sol Kanat), a left-populist caucus that aims to build "new left politics" within the party. It includes social democrat and democratic socialist groups within, and integrates ideas like participatory democracy, anti-militarism and anti-imperialism to mainstream republicanism. On 1 July 2021, We for the Future group decided to merge with another internal caucus, the 'Left Wing'. The name of the new group has been announced as 'Left Wing for the Future'.
Youth group (Gençler grubu), the caucus that is founded by young central committee members to target the youth. It pushes a centrist agenda within the party.

Historical leaders

Election results

General elections

Presidential elections

Senate elections

Local elections

See also 

 List of political parties in Turkey
 The Six Arrows (flag of CHP)
 Left of Center (Turkey)
 Ulus
 Ulusalcılık

References

External links 

 

 
Political parties in Turkey
Centre-left parties
Secularism in Turkey
Social democratic parties
Socialist International
Nationalist parties in Turkey
Pro-European political parties in Turkey